Otūmoetai is a suburb of the city of Tauranga in the Bay of Plenty region of New Zealand.

The Otūmoetai peninsula includes both the Otūmoetai suburb, and the neighbouring suburbs of Matua and Bellevue.

History
The name is claimed to translate to "Peaceful Waters" from Maori to English, as the Matua Saltmarsh and Tauranga Harbour borders Otūmoetai. The New Zealand Ministry for Culture and Heritage gives a translation of "place where the tide stands still as if asleep" for Ōtǖmoetai.

Before the 1950s Otūmoetai was largely orchards and farms but then houses started to be built in Brookfield, Otūmoetai Central and Pillans Point. Following this the suburb started to take shape and in the 1990s the last pieces of land left in the suburb were developed into housing.

In the 21st century, the suburb has gone through intensification with the building of apartments.

Demographics

Otūmoetai had a population of 8,034 at the 2018 New Zealand census, an increase of 879 people (12.3%) since the 2013 census, and an increase of 948 people (13.4%) since the 2006 census. There were 3,252 households, comprising 3,789 males and 4,245 females, giving a sex ratio of 0.89 males per female, with 1,551 people (19.3%) aged under 15 years, 1,146 (14.3%) aged 15 to 29, 3,516 (43.8%) aged 30 to 64, and 1,824 (22.7%) aged 65 or older.

Ethnicities were 88.5% European/Pākehā, 11.6% Māori, 1.5% Pacific peoples, 6.6% Asian, and 2.2% other ethnicities. People may identify with more than one ethnicity.

The percentage of people born overseas was 20.1, compared with 27.1% nationally.

Although some people chose not to answer the census's question about religious affiliation, 52.5% had no religion, 37.1% were Christian, 0.4% had Māori religious beliefs, 0.8% were Hindu, 0.3% were Muslim, 0.6% were Buddhist and 2.4% had other religions.

Of those at least 15 years old, 1,503 (23.2%) people had a bachelor's or higher degree, and 966 (14.9%) people had no formal qualifications. 1,212 people (18.7%) earned over $70,000 compared to 17.2% nationally. The employment status of those at least 15 was that 3,030 (46.7%) people were employed full-time, 1,041 (16.1%) were part-time, and 177 (2.7%) were unemployed.

Education

Otumoetai College and Ōtūmoetai Intermediate are located in neighbouring Bellevue.

References

Suburbs of Tauranga
Populated places around the Tauranga Harbour